The 2004 United States presidential election in South Dakota took place on November 2, 2004, and was part of the 2004 United States presidential election. Voters chose three representatives, or electors to the Electoral College, who voted for president and vice president.

South Dakota was won by incumbent President George W. Bush by a 21.5 point margin of victory. Prior to the election, all 12 news organizations considered this a state Bush would win, or otherwise considered as a safe red state. Since 1940, the state has voted for the Republican nominee in every presidential election, except 1964.

Primaries
 2004 South Dakota Democratic presidential primary

Campaign

Predictions
There were twelve news organizations who made state-by-state predictions of the election. Here are their last predictions before election day.

 D.C. Political Report: Solid Republican
 Associated Press: Solid Bush
 CNN: Bush
Cook Political Report: Solid Republican
 Newsweek: Solid Bush
New York Times: Solid Bush
 Rasmussen Reports: Bush
 Research 2000: Solid Bush
Washington Post: Bush
Washington Times: Solid Bush
Zogby International: Bush
 Washington Dispatch: Bush

Polling
Bush won every pre-election by a double-digit margin. The final three poll average showed Bush with 55% to Kerry at 39 percent

Fundraising
Bush raised $399,805. Kerry raised $71,553.

Advertising and visits
Neither campaign advertised or visited this state during the fall campaign season.

Analysis
South Dakota politics are generally dominated by the Republican Party, and the state has not supported a Democratic presidential candidate since 1964 — even George McGovern, the Democratic nominee in 1972 and himself a South Dakotan, did not carry the state. Additionally, a Democrat has not won the governorship since 1978. As of 2006, Republicans held a ten percent voter registration advantage over Democrats and hold majorities in both the state House of Representatives and Senate.

Despite the state's general Republican and conservative leanings, Democrats have found success in various statewide elections, most notably in those involving South Dakota's congressional representatives in Washington. Two of the three members of the state's congressional delegation at the time were Democrats, and Senator Tom Daschle was the Senate minority leader (and briefly its majority leader during Democratic control of the Senate in 2001–02).

Opposition to the Iraq War in this isolationist state did allow Kerry to improve upon Al Gore’s  performance in 2000 by two percentage points. Kerry's gains may also be attributed to Daschle's efforts to get Native American votes during his narrow defeat to John Thune in the concurrent Senate election.  As a result, Kerry won four counties – Corson, Day, Roberts and Ziebach – that Gore had not carried in 2000.

Results

Results by county

Counties that flipped from Republican to Democratic
Corson (Largest city: McLaughlin)
Day (Largest city: Webster)
Roberts (Largest city: Sisseton)
Ziebach (Largest city: Dupree)

By congressional district
Due to the state's small population, only one congressional district is allocated. This district, called the At-Large district, because it covers the entire state, and thus is equivalent to the statewide election results.

Electors

Technically the voters of SD cast their ballots for electors: representatives to the Electoral College. SD is allocated 3 electors because it has 1 congressional districts and 2 senators. All candidates who appear on the ballot or qualify to receive write-in votes must submit a list of 3 electors, who pledge to vote for their candidate and his or her running mate. Whoever wins the majority of votes in the state is awarded all 3 electoral votes. Their chosen electors then vote for president and vice president. Although electors are pledged to their candidate and running mate, they are not obligated to vote for them. An elector who votes for someone other than his or her candidate is known as a faithless elector.

The electors of each state and the District of Columbia met on December 13, 2004, to cast their votes for president and vice president. The Electoral College itself never meets as one body. Instead the electors from each state and the District of Columbia met in their respective capitols.

The following were the members of the Electoral College from the state. All 3 were pledged for Bush/Cheney.
 Dennis Daugaard
 Larry Long
 Mike Rounds

See also
 Presidency of George W. Bush
 United States presidential elections in South Dakota

References

South Dakota
2004
Presidential